Industrial and General Insurance (IGI) is an Nigeria insurance company and is a major provider of insurance and risk management services in West Africa. It has subsidiaries, in Ghana, the Gambia, Rwanda and Uganda and a representative offices in London and Washington, DC. 

The company's main focus is insurance services, but through subsidiary companies, it is also invested in a diverse array of other sectors, including: banking, construction, engineering, mining, real estate, telecommunications and waste management. 

, the company's total assets were estimated at about US$338 million (NGN:53.1 billion), with shareholders' equity of about US$140 million (NGN:22 billion). At that time, IGI was the largest insurance company in Nigeria and the largest underwriter in West Africa.

History
Industrial and General Insurance Company Plc was founded as a limited liability company on 31 October 1991 by Oluremi (Remi) Olowude. The company commenced business in January 1992. Remi Olowude was both founder and CEO until he died in September 2014.

Branch network
The company has a branch network in 45 urban locations in the majority of states in the Federal Republic of Nigeria.

Products and services
The products and services offered by IGI include the following classes of insurance and non-insurance services:

 Individual Life Products
 Group Life Products
 Aviation Insurance
 Engineering Insurance
 General Business Insurance
 Global Health Insurance Plan
 Marine Insurance
 Oil & Energy Insurance Services

Other investments
The company, either alone or together with other subsidiaries, is an investor in the following entities:

 National Insurance Corporation – IGI is the majority shareholder (51%) in NIC, the largest insurance company in Uganda.
 Global Trust Bank – IGI and its Ugandan subsidiary NIC, jointly owned 91% of Uganda's 15th largest bank by assets; the bank failed in 2014 and DFCU Bank acquired the deposits and viable assets.
 DFCU Group – Through NIC, IGI is a minority shareholder in the holding company of DFCU Bank, the 5th largest bank in Uganda.
 SONARWA – IGI owns a controlling majority interest in Rwanda's largest insurance company.
 Industrial and General Insurance Company (Ghana) Limited.
 IGI Life Assurance Ghana Limited – Accra, Ghana
 Monarch Communications Limited – Lagos, Nigeria
 Global Trust Savings and Loans Limited – Lagos, Nigeria
 IGI Gamstar Insurance Company Limited, the Gambia – Banjul, the Gambia
 All Crown Registrars Limited
 IGI Pension Fund Managers Limited
 International Health Management Services Limited.

Governance
The governing body of the company is the twelve-member board of directors. General Yakubu Gowon, one of the non-executive board members, is the chairman.

See also
 National Insurance Company
 Economy of Nigeria

References

Insurance companies of Nigeria
Multinational companies based in Lagos
Financial services companies established in 1991
Nigerian companies established in 1991
Companies listed on the Nigerian Stock Exchange